Wholeness and the Implicate Order is a book by theoretical physicist David Bohm. It was originally published in 1980 by Routledge, Great Britain.

The book is considered a basic reference for Bohm's concepts of undivided wholeness and of implicate and explicate orders, as well as of Bohm's rheomode - an experimental language based on verbs. The book is cited, for example, by philosopher Steven M. Rosen in his book The Self-evolving Cosmos, by mathematician and theologian Kevin J. Sharpe in his book David Bohm's World, by theologian Joseph P. Farrell in Babylon's Banksters, and by theologian John C. Polkinghorne in his book One World.

Chapters 
 Fragmentation and wholeness
 The rheomode – an experiment with language and thought
 Reality and knowledge considered as process
 Hidden variables in the quantum theory
 Quantum theory as an indication of a new order in physics, Part A: The development of new orders as shown through the history of physics
 Quantum theory as an indication of a new order in physics, Part B: Implicate and explicate order in physical law
 The enfolding-unfolding universe and consciousness

References 
 David Bohm: Wholeness and the Implicate Order, 1980, Routledge,  (Master e-book ISBN, reprint 2005)

See also 
 Process philosophy

1980 non-fiction books
Philosophy books
Science books
Philosophy of science books
Cognitive science literature
Routledge books